George Gerald "Gerry, Stub" Carson (October 10, 1903 — November 9, 1956) was a Canadian professional ice hockey defenceman who played 261 games in the National Hockey League (NHL) with the Montreal Canadiens and New York Rangers and Montreal Maroons between 1928 and 1937. He won the Stanley Cup with the Montreal Canadiens in 1930. His older brothers Frank and Bill also played in the NHL.

Career statistics

Regular season and playoffs

External links
 

1903 births
1956 deaths
Canadian ice hockey defencemen
Ice hockey people from Ontario
Montreal Canadiens players
Montreal Maroons players
New York Rangers players
Ontario Hockey Association Senior A League (1890–1979) players
Philadelphia Arrows players
Providence Reds players
Sportspeople from Parry Sound, Ontario
Stanley Cup champions
Canadian expatriate ice hockey players in the United States